Group B was the second of three groups of the 2022 AFC Women's Asian Cup that took place from 21 to 27 February 2022. The group consisted of Australia, Indonesia, the Philippines and Thailand. The top three teams, Australia, the Philippines and Thailand, qualified for the knockout stage. The two teams that advanced are Australia and Philippines. Thailand also made the quarter-finals as they are not comparatively last to the other third-place teams.

Teams

Standings

Matches

Australia vs Indonesia

Thailand vs Philippines

Philippines vs Australia

Indonesia vs Thailand

Australia vs Thailand

Philippines vs Indonesia

Discipline
Fair play points would have been used as tie-breakers in the group if the overall and head-to-head records of teams were tied, or if teams had the same record in the ranking of third-placed teams. These were calculated based on yellow and red cards received in all group matches as follows:

 yellow card = 1 point
 red card as a result of two yellow cards = 3 points
 direct red card = 3 points
 yellow card followed by direct red card = 4 points

References

External links
, the-AFC.com

Group B